Edward Townsend may refer to:

 Edward D. Townsend (1817–1893), Adjutant General of the United States Army
 Edward W. Townsend (1855–1942), U.S. Representative from New Jersey
 Edward Loveden Townsend (ca. 1751-1822), UK member of parliament